Malcolm Harding may refer to:

Malcolm Harding (archbishop of Rupert's Land) (1863–1949), Anglican metropolitan bishop in Canada
Malcolm Harding (bishop of Brandon) (born 1936), Anglican bishop in Canada
Malcolm Harding (cricketer) (born 1959), New Zealand cricketer
Malcolm Harding (You), fictional character